Francisco Uriburu (July 13, 1837 – February 10, 1906) was an Argentine businessman and politician, member of the Argentine Chamber of Deputies for Salta province from 1872 to 1876. He was Minister of the Treasury in 1890.

References

1837 births
People from Salta Province
Argentine businesspeople
Argentine Ministers of Finance
Members of the Argentine Chamber of Deputies elected in Salta
Members of the Argentine Senate for Salta
Argentine people of Basque descent
1906 deaths